George Fitch (November 3, 1848 – March 30, 1896) was a member of the Wisconsin State Senate.

Biography
Fitch was born on November 3, 1848, in Glens Falls, New York. He was educated in Norwalk, Connecticut before moving to Berlin, Wisconsin in 1871. He married Helen Porter (1858–1950) in 1882. He died of appendicitis at his home in Berlin and was buried at Riverside Cemetery in Oshkosh.

Career
Fitch was elected to the Wisconsin State Senate in 1886, representing the 9th district from 1887 to 1890. In 1885, he was elected Mayor of Berlin. He was a Republican.

References

External links

Politicians from Glens Falls, New York
Politicians from Norwalk, Connecticut
People from Berlin, Wisconsin
Deaths from appendicitis
Republican Party Wisconsin state senators
Mayors of places in Wisconsin
1848 births
1896 deaths
19th-century American politicians
Republican Party members of the Wisconsin State Assembly